Cromwell (Māori: Tīrau) is a town in Central Otago region of the South Island of New Zealand. Cromwell is located on the shores of Lake Dunstan where the Kawarau river joins Lake Dunstan.  Cromwell was established during the Otago gold rush and is now more known as one of the sub regions of the Central Otago wine region. In 2018, the town of Cromwell was home to a population of 5610 people.

Geography 
The road to Alexandra winds through the Cromwell Gorge. A point near Cromwell lies 119 kilometres from the sea, the farthest from the sea anywhere in New Zealand.
A prominent feature surrounding much of the town is the man-made Lake Dunstan.

Cromwell is surrounded by the Pisa mountain range to the north (including Mount Pisa, 1963 metres) the Dunstan mountains to the northeast (including Mount Dunstan, 1667 metres) Mount Difficulty (1285 metres) to the west and the Old Woman Range and Cairnmuir mountains to the south.

Nearby settlements are at Bannockburn, Lowburn, Tarras, and Ripponvale.

Cromwell has a strategic location between the Lindis and the Haast passes, and acts as a hub between the towns of Wānaka, Queenstown and Alexandra.

Cromwell is also the home of the Cromwell Chafer Beetle (Prodontria lewisi).

The 45th parallel south runs just north of the township.

Cromwell lay at the confluence of the Clutha River and the Kawarau River, which was noted for the difference between the colours of the waters of the two rivers and also for the historic bridge at the convergence of the two. Since the construction of the Clyde Dam and the filling of Lake Dunstan in the early 1990s the river confluence was drowned, as was the old town centre.

History 
European exploration of the area first occurred in September 1853 by Nathaniel Chalmers. Further explorations occurred in the late 1850s with detailed surveys occurring in 1861.

In 1862, gold was discovered below the Junction by two miners, Horatio Hartley and Christopher Reilly. Once the word of a gold strike was out, there was an influx of several thousand miners to the area as well as supporting nine hotels in Cromwell.

Cromwell was originally known as "The Junction", being at the confluence of the Clutha River / Mata-Au and the Kawarau River. It was renamed Cromwell in the middle of 1863 by J. A. Connell (of the Dunedin firm Connell and Moodie) who was from Northern Ireland because of "a silly rivalry between a Northern Irish surveyor and Southern Irish miners" based in the district. Cromwell was declared a municipality in 1866. The government funded the construction of a bridge across the Clutha in 1866 (which cost 28,000 pounds). This was rebuilt in 1891. Bishop Selwyn visited in 1866. Cromwell's newspaper, The Cromwell Argus, was established in 1869. The Cromwell council chambers were completed in 1869 and the Cromwell district hospital was established in 1875 with wards to provide beds for ten inpatients.

The population was 424 people in 1878 and increased to 429 people in 1881. Gold mining by individuals was replaced by dredging by companies in the 1890s. but was short lived. The population decreased with smaller scale mining activities continuing until the 1930s. The Cromwell railway station, connecting Cromwell to Dunedin was opened in July 1921. It burnt down in 1942 and was subsequently rebuilt. it was closed in 1976 with the railway line from Clyde to Cromwell being closed in 1980.

Soldiers from Cromwell served in World War 1 with 13 losing their lives. A cenotaph was unveiled on 25 April 1923 to recognise their sacrifice. A further 11 soldiers from Cromwell died during World War II. A memorial hall was built in the 1950s which is dedicated to those fallen in the two World Wars.

As gold ran out, Cromwell became the service centre for an extensive farming and stone fruit growing area. An irrigation scheme was built in the 1920s diverting water from the Kawarau river to irrigate a large area of land near Ripponvale.

The stone fruit industry is commemorated with the giant sculpture of stone fruit which stands outside the northern end of the town. It was built by the Cromwell Rotary Club in 1990 with the design coming from Otto Muller. The sculpture is regularly repainted.

The decision to build Clyde Dam and use Cromwell as the accommodation base brought many changes to the town. In the early stages, a government information centre in Cromwell was set on fire in a late-night attack.

Approximately one-third of the town was rebuilt on higher ground.  A total of 60 homes and 50 commercial properties were affected. The changes included the doubling of the residential area, relocation of the old town centre (now called "Old Cromwell Town"), upgrading of services, and the provision of modern educational and sports facilities, and a new bridge. The town centre was relocated between 1984 and 1985 to a new site known as "The Mall," that now houses the main retail, service and civic buildings in Cromwell. Several of the old buildings of the town which escaped the flooding have been retained as a historic precinct close to the shore of the Kawarau.

The lake started to fill in autumn of 1992 with 2000 hectares including farmland and 17 orchards also being flooded by Lake Dunstan.

The town was named after Oliver Cromwell and, as well as "The Junction", the town was previously known as "The Point" and "Kawarau".

Cromwell is nicknamed the "Fruit Bowl of the South".

Climate 
Cromwell receives around 400 mm of rain a year due to its inland location. Although it is widely believed to have a continental climate, the town officially has an oceanic climate (Cfb) with rainfall just enough to escape the semi-arid climate (Bsk) classification.

Demography 
The population of Cromwell was 838 people in 1951; 885 people in 1956 and 942 people in 1961.

Cromwell had a population of 5,610 at the 2018 New Zealand census, an increase of 1,269 people (29.2%) since the 2013 census, and an increase of 1,863 people (49.7%) since the 2006 census. There were 2,109 households. There were 2,898 males and 2,709 females, giving a sex ratio of 1.07 males per female, with 1,041 people (18.6%) aged under 15 years, 912 (16.3%) aged 15 to 29, 2,604 (46.4%) aged 30 to 64, and 1,053 (18.8%) aged 65 or older.

Ethnicities were 90.1% European/Pākehā, 9.1% Māori, 2.0% Pacific peoples, 3.9% Asian, and 2.5% other ethnicities (totals add to more than 100% since people could identify with multiple ethnicities).

The proportion of people born overseas was 16.8%, compared with 27.1% nationally.

Although some people objected to giving their religion, 56.3% had no religion, 35.7% were Christian, 0.2% were Hindu, 0.2% were Muslim, 0.5% were Buddhist and 2.0% had other religions.

Of those at least 15 years old, 666 (14.6%) people had a bachelor or higher degree, and 852 (18.6%) people had no formal qualifications. 747 people (16.3%) earned over $70,000 compared to 17.2% nationally. The employment status of those at least 15 was that 2,730 (59.8%) people were employed full-time, 663 (14.5%) were part-time, and 75 (1.6%) were unemployed.

Lindis-Nevis Valleys
The statistical area of Lindis-Nevis Valleys, which includes Bannockburn and Pisa Moorings, surrounds but does not include Cromwell.

Lindis-Nevis Valleys had a population of 2,391 at the 2018 New Zealand census, an increase of 714 people (42.6%) since the 2013 census, and an increase of 1,242 people (108.1%) since the 2006 census. There were 963 households. There were 1,215 males and 1,173 females, giving a sex ratio of 1.04 males per female. The median age was 46.5 years (compared with 37.4 years nationally), with 387 people (16.2%) aged under 15 years, 330 (13.8%) aged 15 to 29, 1,224 (51.2%) aged 30 to 64, and 447 (18.7%) aged 65 or older.

Ethnicities were 95.1% European/Pākehā, 5.6% Māori, 1.4% Pacific peoples, 1.3% Asian, and 2.0% other ethnicities (totals add to more than 100% since people could identify with multiple ethnicities).

The proportion of people born overseas was 16.6%, compared with 27.1% nationally.

Although some people objected to giving their religion, 59.8% had no religion, 30.7% were Christian, 0.4% were Hindu, 0.4% were Buddhist and 1.6% had other religions.

Of those at least 15 years old, 468 (23.4%) people had a bachelor or higher degree, and 288 (14.4%) people had no formal qualifications. The median income was $40,400, compared with $31,800 nationally. 429 people (21.4%) earned over $70,000 compared to 17.2% nationally. The employment status of those at least 15 was that 1,188 (59.3%) people were employed full-time, 321 (16.0%) were part-time, and 33 (1.6%) were unemployed.

Amenities

Motorsport park and museum 
The Highlands Motorsport Park is located on the western edge of Cromwell. The park includes a $25 million classic car museum as well as a 4100 metre long race track.

Cromwell museum 
The Cromwell museum was established in the 1960s. It had to relocate in 1988 due to its original location being due to be flooded by the filling of Lake Dunstan. It is currently located at 47 The Mall. Its collections include Chinese artefacts (which tell of the history of the Chinese gold miners in the region), moa bones, domestic and agricultural items  and photographs of Cromwell.

Cromwell swimming pool 
The Cromwell swimming pool was built in the 1980s. It was upgraded in 2007. Located on Barry Avenue, the indoor complex contains a 25-metre pool, a learners' pool and a toddler's pool.

Kiwi water park 
The Kiwi water park is located five minutes outside of Cromwell on state highway 6. The park containing various inflatable  obstacles, water toys and diving boards. It attracted 30,000 visitors in the summer of 2021/22. There was doubt that it would open for the 2022 / 23 summer season due to traffic safety issues entering the park but a resolution was achieved.

Cromwell public library 
The Cromwell public library is located at 43 The Mall. It is open six days each week and is administered by Central Otago and Queenstown Lakes Library consortia. The library has wifi, computer facilities and wheelchair access as well as a range of fiction and non – fiction books, magazines and DVDs.

Sport and recreation

Rugby 
The Cromwell rugby club was established in 1888 and had its 125th Jubilee in 2013. It has had many successes with the 2007 team winning every trophy that season. Cromwell lost the Central Otago rugby final to Wakatipu in 2022.

Mountain biking 
The Lake Dunstan mountain bike trail was opened in May 2021. It connects Cromwell to Clyde and the Otago Central Rail Trail. The Lake Dunstan mountain bike trail is 55 kilometres long and includes cantilevered platforms to get around a series of granite cliffs. In the first ten months after opening, 62560 people had ridden the trail. Some of the trail has steeper climbs and is more remote and a safety video was made to prepare riders in what to expect on the trail.

Other trails in the Cromwell area include the 16 kilometre Cromwell Heritage Precinct to Smith's Way along the Lake Dunstan foreshore. In August 2022, the Cromwell mountain bike club were planning to build a mountain bike trail park at Shannon Farm. It was thought that it would include 14 kilometres of grade 3 (intermediate) to 5 (expert) trails.

Cromwell golf club 
The Cromwell golf club held its first meeting in 1903. The course was redesigned in 2010 by Greg Turner and Scott MacPherson. The Cromwell Golf Club has held the New Zealand Open final qualifying event on more than one occasion.  It has also held the South Island Amateur Championships, the 1988 NZ Seniors Championship and the 2001 Freyberg Masters. In 2019,  The golf course was ranked the 22nd best course out of the top 50 courses by New Zealand Golf Digest. The golf course is an 18 hole is a sand-based, links-style course.

Cromwell bowling club 
The Cromwell bowling club was established in August 1911. An artificial green was installed in 2015 which widened the playing season to ten months of the year. The club is located at 50 Alpha Street.

Cromwell racecourse 
Horse racing has occurred on the racecourse land since 1862, with the Cromwell Jockey Club operating the racecourse between 1867 and 1999. In 1876, the Cromwell Racecourse Reserve Act was enacted for the purposes of establishing a board of trustees and putting aside the land for the public racecourse. The racecourse land has also been used as the Cromwell racecourse aerodrome, for outdoor concerts and pony club events. It has a 1600-metre track with a 350-metre straight. A new grandstand was built in 2007.

The longest running race to be held at the Cromwell racecourse is the Cromwell gallops race meeting which, in 2022,  had been held annually for 156 years.

Historic places

Cromwell heritage precinct

The construction of the Clyde Dam created Lake Dunstan, which consumed part of the old Cromwell town.  Some of the historic buildings were saved or rebuilt to create the heritage precinct. Near the precinct is the Cromwell Kilwinning Lodge No.98 which was built in 1869.

Former St John's Presbyterian church 

Presbyterian church services where first held in Cromwell by the 1860s. In the 1870s, fundraising took place to build a church. The St John's Presbyterian church was designed by F.W. Burwell in a gothic style and built by Grant and Mackellar out of local schist stone. The church hall was added in 1913. The church closed in 2004 and was sold. The building is a category two historic place.

Mary Immaculate and the Irish Martyrs Catholic church 

The Mary Immaculate and the Irish Martyrs Catholic church was opened in April 1909. The church has a 20 metre tall belltower with an orange tiled roof. At the time of its opening, it was described as "far and away the handsomest building in Cromwell". The church was named in recognition of the Irish Catholic gold-miners living in the town.

St Andrew's Anglican church 

St Andrew's Anglican church was opened in 1874. It was designed in a Gothic style. The site for the church was chosen when Bishop Samuel Tarratt Nevill visited in 1873. John Marsh, a local Cromwell resident donated the land for the church and the church cost 700 pounds to build. The Ladies Guild raised 150 pounds of the cost in 1874. Leadlight windows were installed in the east and west ends in 1893. A pipe organ was installed in 1919. Electricity was installed in the church in 1926 and the church hall was built in 1932.

Athenaeum hall 
The Athenaeum Hall was built in 1874. It was used to house the Cromwell Museum until 1988 and then earthworks from the building of Lake Dunstan left it three quarters buried. Work (including stonemasonry) was being completed in 2017 to stabilise the remaining walls.

Litany Street cemetery 
The Litany Street cemetery was Cromwell's first cemetery and was established in 1865. This cemetery is the resting place for a number of the early Cromwell gold miners. A number of the early Chinese immigrants who came to Cromwell in search of gold are also buried here. In the early 1900s a second cemetery was created and is known as the new Cromwell cemetery.

Former Cromwell courthouse 

The Cromwell courthouse was built by William Grant (a carpenter) and James Ritchie (a stonemason) and was completed in 1872. It was used at the courthouse in Cromwell for over one hundred years. It is now privately owned. It is a category two Historic Place.

Bannockburn
Bannockburn is located 5.8 km south of Cromwell via Bannockburn road.  It is possible to walk to Bannockburn via the 11 kilometre Cromwell to Bannockburn lakeside walk.  Bannockburn is a small town which was once the centre of a gold mining industry. Historic buildings include the hotel, post office, Stewart's store, and a number of homes. Next to the town of Bannockburn are the Bannockburn sluicings. These include dams, tunnels, water races and shafts created during the gold mining era between 1865 and 1910.

Bendigo goldfields
Bendigo was a successful quartz mining area for over half a century. From the site of the old Bendigo township at the top of the Bendigo Loop Road a steep, narrow vehicle track winds up into the hills to Logantown and even further up to Welshtown, where remains of old stone cottages can be found.

Carrick goldfields

The ruins of Carricktown are 4 km up a 4WD track from the old mining area of Quartzville (near the end of Quartzville Road), and the Young Australian 6m overshot water-wheel can be found a further 3 km on. The track continues up to Duffer's Saddle. Return down Nevis Road to Bannockburn.

Education
The first school in Cromwell opened in 1865, but its roll outstripped its capacity and it was replaced in 1874. Another school opened in 1915 with a secondary section in 1924. Cromwell District High School opened in 1929, and became Cromwell College in 1978 when it changed to accept year 7 and 8 students.

Otago Polytechnic has a campus in Cromwell specialising in horticulture, catering and tourism. Its crop centre provides advisory services to horticulturalists on commercially viable new crops.

Government 
Cromwell has local government services provided to it by the Central Otago District Council and the Otago Regional Council. Cromwell is part of the Waitaki electorate.

Cromwell mayors
Former mayors of the Borough of Cromwell were as follows

 WJ Barry 1866–1868
 W Whetter 1868–1869
 GW Goodger 1869–1870
 W Smitham 1870–1871
 JD Taylor 1871–1872
 M Fraer 1872–1873
 J Dawkins 1873–1874
 DA Jolly 1874–1877
 SN Brown 1877–1878
 C Colclough 1878–1881
 M Behrens 1881–1883
 J Marsh 1883–1885
 SH Turton 1885–1889
 T McCracken 1889–1891
 DA Jolly 1891–1892
 JL Scott 1892–1895
 T Rooney 1895–1897
 K Pretsch 1897–1899
 E Murrell 1899–1905
 J Little 1905–1909
 E Murrell 1905–1913
 E Jolly 1913–1915
 AM Brodrick 1915–1921
 DC Jolly 1921–1927
 CC Sanders 1927–1929
 CWJ Roberts 1929–1937
 JC Parcell 1937–1943
 RE Austin 1943–1944
 W Partridge 1944–1950
 James Robert Munro 1950–1951
 FG Dunn 1951–1956
 LR Skinner 1956–1958
 LA Jelley 1958–1960
 IG Anderson 1960–1980
 PJ Mead 1980–1986
 DA Butcher 1986–1989

References
Notes

Sources
 
 An Encyclopaedia of New Zealand, 1966, A. H. McLintock (editor)

External links

 Cromwell – promotional site
Ministry of Works and Development. (1987). Clyde dam : Clutha power.

Populated places in Otago
Clutha River
Otago Gold Rush

Populated lakeshore places in New Zealand